The Turlock Lake Formation is an Early Pleistocene geologic formation in the Sierra Nevada foothills in Sacramento County, California. Cities in/over the formation's area include Citrus Heights, Carmichael, and Roseville.

The Turlock Lake Formation is a fan deposit of dominantly granitic alluvium covering the westward extension of the North Merced Pediment and Gravels formation, and directly overlying the Mehrten Formation.

It preserves Early Pleistocene Quaternary period fossils.

See also

 List of fossiliferous stratigraphic units in California
 Paleontology in California

References

 

Pleistocene California
Geology of Sacramento County, California
Calabrian (stage)
Sierra Nevada (United States)
Citrus Heights, California
Carmichael, California
Roseville, California
Geologic formations of California